Entertech was a brand of battery-powered motorized water guns sold in the United States from 1985 to 1990 by the now-defunct LJN. Unlike the colorful designs of many of the simple hand powered pump water guns of that time, most of the Entertech water guns were manufactured from black plastics with a matte finish to resemble real firearms.

Marketing materials and television spots tout, "The look! The feel! The sound! So real! Entertech!" These powerful water guns offered a breakthrough to an existing market of squirt guns that are mostly inexpensive clear-colored plastic, hand powered, with poor effective range. The Entertech line boasts realistic looks and water storage mostly in the form of detachable magazines like their real firearm counterparts. The motorized water pumps make noises that, though not realistic, add an extra level of sensation. All of the guns except the Enforcer shotgun model have a fully automatic rate of fire (approximately 60 rpm) and a 30-foot effective range.

Models

First generation
Side Kick Pistol (product design based on the Colt M1911 pistol, it was connected via a vinyl tube enclosing a water feed tube and trigger actuation wires to a separate pack fashioned to look like an ammunition box that was slung over the user's shoulder which also held a 1-quart water supply) 
M-16 (product design based on the Colt M655 Carbine)
R.P.G. Water Rocket Launcher (product design loosely based on the rocket propelled grenade launcher RPG-7)
AK Centerfire (a submachine gun with a number of design features from the Intratec TEC-22)
Double Clip Baretta (a submachine gun design loosely based on the FMK-3. It was also supplied with two magazines)
Water Laser (a futuristic looking laser gun with the same power and water delivery mechanism as the Side Kick Pistol, except with a 2-quart capacity and designed to be worn as a backpack)
Water Hawk (a large machine pistol based on the Interdynamic AB KG-9)
Uzi Cap Repeater (This was the only item that was not a water gun. It was simply a cap gun designed to look like a Micro Uzi.)

Second generation
Water Grenade Set (a portable water balloon filling device. The unit was designed to resemble a detonator device. It included 20 green water balloons designed to resemble pineapple style hand grenades) 
Defender Shotgun (a pump-action shotgun with a detachable magazine for the water supply and powered by an air pressure discharge system similar to Larami Corporation's Super Soaker guns)
M-60 Rambo Edition (a re-branded M-16 with a box mag, folding bi-pod, a Rambo logo sticker on the gun, and a red Rambo headband. This product was released to promote Rambo: First Blood Part II.)
R.P.G. Water Rocket Launcher Rambo Edition (same as above)
Baretta (a copy of the Beretta 92 pistol, released in stainless steel or all black versions) 
The Saturator (a pump-action shotgun modeled after the Pancor Jackhammer)

Similar products
Photon: The Ultimate Game on Planet Earth: A home version of the Photon laser tag arenas
Gotcha! The Sport!: Non-motorized guns which fired ink-covered soft plastic pellets, a combination of paintball and airsoft. The toys were released in conjunction with the video game Gotcha! The Sport!, also by LJN.

Company closure
The end of Entertech's short-lived success was due in part to incidents in which law enforcement officers shot and killed children toting toy guns, claiming to have mistaken them for actual firearms. Toy guns were used in robberies of retail establishments and banks. Amid these highly publicized incidents, Entertech voluntarily began manufacturing guns with blaze orange-colored caps in 1987, and began a line of less-realistic neon-colored guns later that year.

After Acclaim Entertainment purchased LJN in April 1990, it began phasing out toy manufacturing. Using LJN as a second brand to make video games instead of toys increased the quota of games Acclaim could produce for the Nintendo Entertainment System. In September 1990, Acclaim sold the Entertech brand for $1.7 million.

See also
Super Soaker, a line of water guns sold by Hasbro under the Nerf banner.
Water Warriors, a line of water guns by Buzz Bee Toys
Lazer Tag, a contemporary line of electronic toy guns also involving accidental shootings by police

References

Defunct toy manufacturers
1980s toys
Products introduced in 1986
1990 disestablishments in the United States
Water guns
Toy controversies
Toy weapons
Incidents of violence against boys
Violence against children